Sky Racket is a 1937 American drama film directed by Sam Katzman and starring Bruce Bennett, Joan Barclay, and Duncan Renaldo.

Plot
Marion Bronson (Barclay), aided by her maid Jenny (McDaniel), flees an arranged marriage with Count Barksi (Renaldo).  After stowing away on an airplane piloted by government agent Eric Lane (Bennett), the plane crashes and the duo end up being taken hostage by crooks.

Cast
Bruce Bennett as Eric Lane - Agent 17 (credited as Herman Brix)
Joan Barclay as Marion Bronson
Duncan Renaldo as Count Barksi
Monte Blue as Benjamin Arnold
Hattie McDaniel as Jenny
Jack Mulhall as Henchman Meggs
Roger Williams as Henchman Nick Reagan
Edward Earle as FBI Chief Maddox
Earle Hodgins as Henchman Spike Hodgins
Frank Wayne as Henchman Pete
Ed Cassidy as 	FBI Agent Wilks

References

External links
 
 
 
 
  Sky Racket available for free download at Internet Archive

1937 films
American black-and-white films
1937 drama films
Victory Pictures films
American drama films
1930s English-language films
1930s American films
English-language drama films